Corey "Homicide" Williams (born Carey Williams; August 3, 1977) is an American former professional basketball player. He is best known for his time spent in the Australian National Basketball League (NBL), earning league MVP honors in 2010 with the Townsville Crocodiles.

Early life
Born in New York City as Carey Williams, he changed his name to Corey in middle school after being teased in elementary school. Due to poor grades in middle school, his mother moved him to an all-boys Catholic school in Harlem called Rice High School. A late-bloomer, there were no scholarship offers waiting for Williams when he left high school. There was an offer to play basketball with a junior college in Kansas City called Penn Valley CC. As a freshman in 1995–96, he helped Penn Valley win the NJCAA Men's Division II Basketball Championship before being named a JUCO first-team All-American as a sophomore.

In 1997, Williams joined Alabama State. He spent the next two years there, averaging 12.5 points, 4.9 rebounds, 1.5 assists and 1.6 steals in 54 games, while finishing his degree in criminal justice in 2000, fulfilling a promise to his mother. Coming out of the small Division I school, he had no connections to professional basketball, nor did he have direction from any mentors. He decided to try his luck in the streetball scene, as he proved his worth on the playgrounds of New York City. He was so good, he picked up the nickname "Homicide" by the streetball MCs.

Professional career

Early years
In 1999, Williams had a stint with the Dakota Wizards of the International Basketball Association. Williams, who graduated from Alabama State in 2000, spent a year touring with the Harlem Globetrotters before spending time in the Dominican Republic with Club San Carlos during the 2000–01 season. After playing in the United States Basketball League with the Brooklyn Kings in 2001, he was invited to try out with a pro team in South Korea. Williams' 2001–02 season was then spent in Brazil with Minas.

After another stint with the Brooklyn Kings in 2003, Williams moved to Sweden in December 2003, where he spent the rest of the 2003–04 season with 08 Stockholm.

2004–05 season
In July 2004, Williams participated in the Denver Nuggets Rookie/Free Agent Camp. He later joined the Yunnan Honghe for the 2004–05 season, marking the team's inaugural season in the Chinese Basketball Association. He averaged 27 points per game with Yunnan. In May 2005, he had a one-game stint with the New Jersey Flyers and a three-game with the Westchester Wildfire, both of the United States Basketball League.

2005–06 season
After spending his summer in 2005 working the competition on the streets of New York City, Williams was noticed by Toronto Raptors assistant coach Jim Todd. As a result, on October 3, 2005, Williams signed with the Raptors for training camp. Williams averaged 4.0 points and 1.0 assists in four pre-season games for the Raptors before being waived by the team on October 27. On November 3, 2005, Williams was selected by the Austin Toros in the ninth round of the 2005 NBA Development League Draft. He was waived by Austin on November 17 before appearing in a game for them.

In December 2005, Williams signed with German team Sellbytel Baskets Nürnberg, but left the team after appearing in just three games due to family problems. In January 2006, he joined the Sioux Falls Skyforce of the Continental Basketball Association. In March 2006, he was named to the CBA All-Defensive Team and All-League Second Team, while finishing the season with a league-high three triple-doubles, also tying the franchise record for triple-doubles in a season with Cedric Hunter. He later had a one-game stint with Venezuelan team Guaiqueríes de Margarita.

2006–07 season
In July 2006, Williams played for the Indiana Pacers during the NBA Summer League. He signed with the Denver Nuggets on October 2, only to be was waived on October 8. Later that month, he joined French team Cholet Basket. He spent just under two months with Cholet, leaving in mid-December having averaged 9.3 points in eight games.

On January 1, 2007, Williams was acquired by the Sioux Falls Skyforce, now of the NBA Development League. After being waived by the Skyforce on February 16, he was picked up by the Dakota Wizards a week later. He helped the Wizards win the D-League championship in April, averaging 14 points, four rebounds and 3.5 assists per game for the 2006–07 season.

NBL (2007–2011)
After playing for the Golden State Warriors during the 2007 NBA Summer League, Williams signed with the Townsville Crocodiles of the Australian National Basketball League (NBL) on October 3, 2007, replacing the injured Rosell Ellis. Williams spent three seasons with the Crocodiles, leading them to semi-final berths in 2009 and 2010. To conclude his third and final season, Williams was named the NBL's Most Valuable Player for the 2009–10 season. He averaged 18.6 points, 5.0 rebounds, and 4.1 assists over his 31 games in 2009–10, shooting the ball at 50.6% from the field.

During his tenure with the Crocodiles, Williams had off-season stints with KK Cibona of Croatia (2008) and Trotamundos de Carabobo of Venezuela (2009).

After being cut by Townsville, Williams joined the Melbourne Tigers in November 2010. On January 2, 2011, he recorded 12 points, 10 rebounds and 11 assists in an 87–66 win over the Adelaide 36ers.

In his four NBL seasons, Williams played 114 games (91 for Townsville and 23 for Melbourne) and averaged 19.1 points, 5.1 rebounds and 4.7 assists per contest.

Lebanon (2012–2016)
Between January 2012 and April 2016, Williams played for multiple teams in Lebanon, including Byblos Club, Bejje SC, Hoops Club, Al Mouttahed Tripoli, and Tadamon Zouk. He also had a 12-game stint in 2012 with Puerto Rican team Piratas de Quebradillas.

Personal life
Williams' ancestral home is Jamaica. As of 2012, he traveled with a Jamaican passport.

Williams became an NBL commentator in 2015. He is also part of the NBL Overtime show which is shown on ESPN Australia and SBS On Demand with Liam Santamaria and Cam Luke.

In December 2021, Williams was appointed as the Creative Director of Basketball for Foot Locker Pacific.

References

External links
Corey Williams at cholet-basket.com
Corey Williams at nbl.com.au

1977 births
Living people
08 Stockholm Human Rights players
Alabama State Hornets basketball players
American expatriate basketball people in Australia
American expatriate basketball people in Brazil
American expatriate basketball people in Croatia
American expatriate basketball people in France
American expatriate basketball people in Germany
American expatriate basketball people in Lebanon
American expatriate basketball people in Sweden
American expatriate basketball people in Venezuela
American men's basketball players
Basketball players from New York City
Cholet Basket players
Dakota Wizards (CBA) players
Dakota Wizards players
Guaiqueríes de Margarita players
Junior college men's basketball players in the United States
KK Cibona players
Melbourne Tigers players
Minas Tênis Clube basketball players
Piratas de Quebradillas players
Point guards
Sioux Falls Skyforce players
Townsville Crocodiles players
Trotamundos B.B.C. players